Frankie Pace is an American stand-up comedian and actor.
 
Pace began his career in a  Long Island comedy club called "The White House Inn" working alongside Eddie Murphy, Rob Bartlett, Jackie Martling, Bob Nelson, Bob Woods, Richie Minnervini, Rosie O'Donnell, Jim Myers and Don McHenry. After a few years he went to New York City where Rick Newman saw him and passed him as a regular at Catch a Rising Star.

Pace performed on the April 14, 1984 episode of Saturday Night Live which featured George McGovern as the host. Producer Cynthia Friedman had Pace write and host his own television show for Night Flight which appeared on the USA Network called "Rick Shaw's Takeout Theater".

Pace later performed for on The Joan Rivers Show and acted on The Cosby Show and The Sopranos. He also performed shows for Bill Boggs Comedy Tonight, Caroline's Comedy Hour and Comic Strip Live with John Mulrooney.

When the comedy club scene slowed down, Pace revamped his act and looked for work in the Catskill Mountains which later led to corporate shows, casino shows and cruise ship performances. Pace later worked for Freddie Roman's "Catskill's on Broadway".

In 1999 Pace appeared in the David Spade film Lost & Found.

In 2012 Pace launched the podcast The Frankie Pace Show where he interviewed comedians and entertainers.

In 2016 Pace did a comedy sketch parody of a Kiss rocker for Topical Waffle on The Tonight Show's YouTube channel.

Pace also posts comedic doodles entitled "Generations" on social media.

References

External links

Year of birth missing (living people)
Living people
American male comedians
American people of Italian descent
American male film actors
American male television actors
American podcasters
Prop comics
American comedy writers
American stand-up comedians